John Park (4 June 1924 – 16 July 2004) was a Hong Kong sailor. He competed at the 1964 Summer Olympics and the 1968 Summer Olympics.

References

External links
 

1924 births
2004 deaths
Hong Kong male sailors (sport)
Olympic sailors of Hong Kong
Sailors at the 1964 Summer Olympics – Dragon
Sailors at the 1968 Summer Olympics – Dragon
Sportspeople from Tianjin